Fred and Barney Meet the Thing is an American animated package show and a spin-off of The Flintstones produced by Hanna-Barbera which aired on NBC from September 8, 1979 to December 1, 1979.

The series contained the following two segments:

The New Fred and Barney Show (a revival of The Flintstones) – one episode, 30 minutes
The Thing (based on the Marvel Comics superhero Thing) – two episodes, 11 minutes each
 
Despite the show's title, the two segments remained separate and did not crossover with one another. The characters of Fred Flintstone, Barney Rubble and Thing were only featured together during the opening title sequence and in brief bumpers between segments. The unusual combination of a Marvel superhero and The Flintstones was possible because, at this time, Marvel Comics owned the rights to several Hanna-Barbera franchises and were, in fact, publishing comic books based upon them; The Flintstones was one of these.

For the 1979–80 season, the series was expanded to a 90-minute timeslot with the addition of The New Shmoo episodes and broadcast under the new title Fred and Barney Meet the Shmoo.

Like many animated series created by Hanna-Barbera in the 1970s, the show contained a laugh track, one of their last productions to do so.

The Thing
The first segment, a very loose adaptation of Marvel Comics' character the Thing, consisted of stories following the adventures of a scrawny, red-headed teenager named Benjy Grimm (voiced by Wayne Morton) who changes into the monstrous and mighty Thing (voiced by Joe Baker) by touching together two magic rings and reciting the words "Thing Ring, do your thing!", releasing an explosion of energy that causes orange rocks to hurl in from every direction and transform him into the stone-skinned superhero. When the Thing spoke, his good-naturedly gruff Brooklyn-accented voice was based on that of comedian Jimmy Durante.

The stories centered mostly around Benjy at Centerville High School with his friends, the beautiful brunette Betty Harkness (voiced by Marilyn Schreffler), her snooty rich boyfriend Ronald Radford (voiced by John Erwin), and Betty's blond tomboy younger sister Kelly (voiced by Noelle North), with minimal adult supervision provided by principal Miss Twilly (voiced by Marilyn Schreffler). Only Kelly and her scientist father Professor Harkness (voiced by John Stephenson) know Benjy's secret identity.

When not battling various mad scientists and getting involved in Scooby-Doo-style mysteries, the Thing spent most of his time using his superhuman strength to protect his pals from everyday dangers and the nasty practical jokes of leather-clad bully Spike Hanrahan (voiced by Art Metrano) and his biker buddies Stretch and Turkey in the Yancy Street Gang.
 
Other members of the Fantastic Four did not appear in the show, and the portrayal of the Thing and his origin story differed greatly from the original comics.

Twenty-six 11-minute episodes of The Thing were produced; two shorts aired per show.

The Thing episodes are owned by Warner Bros. Discovery, through Hanna-Barbera, but the character is owned by The Walt Disney Company due to their purchase of Marvel Comics in late 2009.

Other appearances
In FF #8, Ant-Man and Dragon Man give pink-haired rock star turned reluctant superhero Darla Deering her own Thing Rings to summon Ben Grimm's old rocky Thing-bodied exoskeleton and become the bubble-helmeted Miss Thing, saying "Thing Rings, do your thing--".

Episodes

The New Fred and Barney Show
The "Fred and Barney" half of the show consisted of a second season of seven new 30-minute episodes of The New Fred and Barney Show combined with reruns of first-season episodes.

Episodes

Voice cast

The New Fred and Barney Show
Henry Corden as Fred Flintstone
Jean Vander Pyl as Wilma Flintstone, Pebbles Flintstone
Mel Blanc as Barney Rubble, Dino
Gay Autterson as Betty Rubble
Don Messick as Bamm-Bamm Rubble
John Stephenson as Mr. Slate

The Thing
Wayne Morton as Benjy Grimm, Stretch
Joe Baker as The Thing
Noelle North as Kelly Harkness
Marilyn Schreffler as Betty Harkness, Miss Twilly
John Erwin as Ronald Radford
Art Metrano as Spike Hanrahan
Michael Sheehan as Turkey
John Stephenson as Professor Harkness

References

External links
 

The Flintstones spin-offs
1979 American television series debuts
1979 American television series endings
1970s American animated television series
1970s American high school television series
American children's animated fantasy television series
American children's animated superhero television series
American animated television spin-offs
Crossover animated television series
English-language television shows
Fantastic Four television series
NBC original programming
Television shows based on Marvel Comics
Animated television series based on Marvel Comics
Television series by Hanna-Barbera
Television series set in prehistory